David Nevue (born 1965) is an American solo piano composer and a pianist. He is the founder of online radio station "Whisperings: Solo Piano Radio".

Online radio work
Nevue established the "Whisperings: Solo Piano Radio" internet radio station in August 2003 as a vehicle for promoting his own particular brand of piano music. Believing that the days of the traditional music industry were numbered, he decided to bypass the process of sending demos to record labels, and to use the web to promote his music on his own. Nevue began promoting his music online in 1995, and by 2001, he was able to make music his full-time career.

Whisperings started out as part of the Live365.com family of independent online radio stations, but eventually grew beyond just Live365.com. Most listeners now tune in via the Whisperings web site, iTunes radio or Windows Media Tuner. Whisperings radio is supported by paid subscriptions from listeners who prefer commercial-free broadcasts. 273 artists are featured on the broadcast, including Joe Yamada, David Lanz, David Nevue, Josh Winiberg, Peter Kater, Michael Dulin, Wayne Gratz, Isadar, Louis Landon, Robin Spielberg and Suzanne Ciani.

Nevue also founded The Music Biz Academy, an educational website for independent musicians, and is the author of the book, How to Promote Your Music Successfully on the Internet.

Discography 
 1992 The Tower
 1995 While the Trees Sleep
 1997 The Last Waking Moment
 1999 The Vigil
 2001 Whisperings: The Best of David Nevue
 2001 Postcards from Germany
 2003 O Come Emmanuel
 2004 Sweet Dreams & Starlight
 2005 Overcome
 2007 Adoration: Solo Piano Hymns
 2009 Revelation: Solo Piano for Prayer & Worship
 2011 A Delicate Joy
 2012 Awakenings: The Best of David Nevue (2001-2010)
 2013 Open Sky
 2015 Winding Down
 2019 In the Soft Light of Grace

References

External links 
 
 
 2007 Interview at Mainlypiano.com
 2004 Interview at Mainlypiano.com
 CD reviews at Mainlypiano.com

Living people
1965 births
American male composers
20th-century American composers
Musicians from Oregon
People from North Bend, Oregon
20th-century American pianists
American male pianists
21st-century American pianists
20th-century American male musicians
21st-century American male musicians